Pseudoxytenanthera is a genus of Asian bamboo in the grass family native to India, Sri Lanka, and Indochina.

Species
 Pseudoxytenanthera bourdillonii (Gamble) H.B.Naithani – India
 Pseudoxytenanthera monadelpha (Thwaites) Soderstr. & R.P.Ellis – India, Sri Lanka, Laos, Myanmar, Vietnam
 Pseudoxytenanthera ritcheyi (Munro) H.B.Naithani – India
 Pseudoxytenanthera stocksii (Munro) T.Q.Nguyen – India, Vietnam

Formerly included
see Dendrocalamus Gigantochloa

References

Bambusoideae
Bambusoideae genera